Robert Carswell (born October 26, 1978) is a former American football safety in the National Football League (NFL). He was drafted by the San Diego Chargers in the seventh round of the 2001 NFL Draft. He attended high school at Stone Mountain High School in Stone Mountain, Georgia. He played college football at Clemson. Was a Playboy Magazine All-American in 1999.  Robert currently resides in Columbia, South Carolina with his wife Demetria.  They have one daughter.

NFL career
Carswell played all 16 games his rookie season as a backup to pro bowler Rodney Harrison. In that season he totaled 17 tackles, including 14 solo tackles.

In 2002, he missed most of the team's offseason and preseason festivities with nagging shoulder and knee injuries. After being inactive in four of the team's first six games, Carswell was released by the Chargers on October 15, 2002.

References

1978 births
Living people
American football safeties
Clemson Tigers football players
San Diego Chargers players
Players of American football from Gary, Indiana